Avery Jenkins is an American professional disc golfer from Hinckley, Ohio. He is a former World Champion and three-time US distance champion. In 2016, Jenkins served as commentator for the inaugural Disc Golf World Tour 

Jenkins grew up playing disc golf with his father, Leroy, his mother, three-time Women’s Masters World Champion Sharon, and his sister, four-time World Champion Valarie. He is currently sponsored by Clif Bar, Keen, Savage Apparel, Discmania Golf Discs, and Innova Champion Discs.

Professional career
Jenkins has 56 professional wins, including the 2009 World Championship.

Notable wins

Major, NT playoff record (1-4)

Summary

Annual statistics

†At Year End

Equipment
Jenkins is sponsored by Innova Discs and Discmania Golf Discs. He has a number of past and present signature discs (marked with *), and commonly carries a combination of the following discs: 

Drivers
Destroyer (Pro, Star)*
Firebird (Champion)
Max (Star)
PD (C-line)*
PD2 (C-line, S-line)
Wraith (Star)
XCaliber (Star)

Fairway Drivers
Eagle (Champion)
TeeBird (Star)*
Whippet (KC Pro)

Midranges
Gator (Champion)
Roc (KC Pro)

Putters
Aviar (KC Pro)

References

American disc golfers
Living people
1978 births
Sportspeople from Ohio
People from Santa Cruz, California
People from Hinckley, Ohio